To Hell with Good Intentions may refer to:

 A 1968 speech by Ivan Illich
 A 2002 song by Welsh band Mclusky, appearing on their album Mclusky Do Dallas